Bruno Giussani (born in Switzerland in 1964) is the International curator of TED. He was for 10 years the organization's European Director and member of its senior team, curating and co-hosting TEDGlobal, TEDSummit and various TED special events. Besides his role with TED, he is the Chairman of FIFDH, the Geneva International Film Festival and Forum on Human Rights, which takes place every year in March, and a member of the Board of Directors of Tinext Group, a Swiss software firm he co-founded. From 2005 to 2015 he curated and hosted the annual Swiss conference, Forum des 100. Through his firm Giussani Group LLC he advises public organisations, such as the ICRC, as well as private companies, is an author and a frequent public speaker. In 2011, 2012 and 2014 Wired UK selected him as one of the "Wired 100". In January 2016 he received the  SwissAward/Person of the year 2015 in the category "Economy". He lives in Switzerland.

TED
Giussani is the International Curator of TED, the nonprofit organization behind the TED conferences and the popular online TEDtalks, and was for 10 years a member of its senior team.

Since 2005, he has curated hundreds of TED Talks, including by Pope Francis, Antonio Guterres, Margrethe Vestager, Elif Shafak, Daniel Suarez, Jennifer Doudna, Alejandro Aravena, Melissa Fleming, Malte Spitz, Charmian Gooch, Taryn Simon, Melinda Gates and Bill Gates, Amy Cuddy, Alain de Botton, Glenn Greenwald, Suzanne Simard, Yanis Varoufakis, Wayne McGregor, Jon Ronson, Yuval Noah Harari, Tim Harford, Richard Wilkinson, Hans and Ola Rosling, Pico Iyer, Dambisa Moyo, Zeynep Tufekci, Michael Green, Elizabeth Lev, Hilary Cottam, Vincent Moon and Nana Vasconcelos, Kimberley Motley, Fred Swaniker, Gerard Ryle, James Veitch, Carole Cadwalladr, Tim Berners-Lee, Alex Honnold, Johan Rockström, Nicola Sturgeon, Tshering Tobgay, Tracy Chevalier, George Monbiot, Alain de Botton, Chimamanda Ngozi Adichie, and Mariana Mazzucato.

Through conferences, TED Talks available free of charge and subtitled in many languages, the Audacious Project, the TED Fellowship, an educational initiative called TED-Ed, thousands of local independently organized events under the label TEDx, collaborations with organisations ranging from NPR to Chinese web portals and Indian television, and more, TED focuses on "Ideas Worth Spreading." Its flagship conferences are considered among the world's most innovative and are regularly sold out months in advance. Giussani joined TED in 2005, and produced the first TEDGlobal event in Oxford, England. TEDGlobal 2014 took place in Rio de Janeiro, Brazil, while TEDSummit 2019 was held in Edinburgh, Scotland.

Human Rights Film Festival FIFDH
Since 2017 Giussani is the chairman of the Geneva International Film Festival on Human Rights (FIFDH in its French acronym).

Journalism
Prior to joining TED, Giussani was a well-known writer and commentator. For several years he edited the political section of Swiss news magazine L'Hebdo before becoming its US correspondent and, later, its technology columnist and editor of the first Swiss online news web site, Webdo, launched in 1995. His writings have been published in newspapers, magazines and websites in Europe and the United States, including The New York Times (for which he wrote the EuroBytes column from 1996 to 2000), The Wall Street Journal Europe, the European editions of Wired magazine, The Economist, Business Week, The International Herald Tribune, the Neue Zürcher Zeitung (Switzerland), L'Hebdo (Switzerland), Libération (France), Il Sole-24Ore (Italy), The Huffington Post, and more. He was also the European editor of the now-defunct Industry Standard magazine and one of the founding editors of its European version, and the producer of the magazine's Global Internet Summit (Barcelona, 2000).

His former blog, Lunch Over IP, which he wrote from 2005 to 2008 (still available online as an archive) won him a national "Golden Mouse" award in 2006 for the best Swiss theme blog, while his articles on technology and innovation in L'Hebdo were awarded in 1995 the Swiss prize for technology journalism.

Books
He has authored or co-authored several books, favoring a pragmatic, no-hype approach. A reviewer in The International Herald Tribune wrote that in his book Roam. Making Sense of the Wireless Internet (Random House, 2001 and 2002) he "first bursts the bubble of mobile hype and then explains why wireless communications really matters and how it works."

Other idea sharing initiatives
In 2005 he launched with L'Hebdo the annual Forum des 100 in Lausanne, which he hosted for 10 years and which is today considered the foremost conference in Western Switzerland. He has also been instrumental in launching and developing the LIFT conference (Geneva, Switzerland) and was an adviser to the DLD conference (Munich, Germany) among other ideas-sharing initiatives. From 1998 to 2000 he was Head of Online Strategy at the World Economic Forum (also known as the Davos Forum). He was a member of the jury of Bloomberg Philanthropies' Mayors Challenge 2014.

Internet companies
Giussani has co-founded two Internet companies: Tinet, in 1995, the first Internet service provider in the Italian-speaking part of Switzerland (then sold to Swissonline/Cablecom), and Tinext, in 2000, a software firm with offices in Switzerland, Italy and Dubai, of which he is Vice-Chairman. He was the Director of Innovation of the short-lived 3GMobile, an attempt to launch a new mobile telecom player in Switzerland. From 2002 to 2008 he was a member of the board of Namics, the largest Swiss Internet consultancy.

Education
Giussani is an alumnus of the University of Geneva, where he graduated in Social and Economic Sciences in 1989. He was a 2004 Fellow at the John S. Knight Fellowships for Professional Journalists at Stanford University and an Affiliated Fellow at the Freeman Spogli Institute for International Studies at Stanford.

References

External links

Swiss writers
TED (conference)
1964 births
Living people